Iris tenuissima is a species of iris known by the common name longtube iris.

It is endemic to California, where it is a common wildflower in the woodlands and forests of the northern part of the state.

Description
This rhizomatous perennial herb produces narrow leaves and an erect inflorescence bearing two iris flowers. The flower has a long tubular throat which may exceed 5 centimeters in length before it opens into white, purple, or reddish-brown streaked tepals.

Subspecies
Iris tenuissima ssp. purdyiformis—affinity to serpentine soil.
Iris tenuissima ssp. tenuissima

External links
 Calflora Database: Iris tenuissima (longtube iris, slender iris)
Jepson Manual eFlora (TJM2) treatment of Iris tenuissima
USDA Plants Profile for Iris tenuissima (longtube iris)
Flora of North America
UC Photos gallery — Iris tenuissima

tenuissima
Endemic flora of California
Flora of the Klamath Mountains
Flora of the Sierra Nevada (United States)
Natural history of the California chaparral and woodlands
Natural history of the California Coast Ranges
Flora without expected TNC conservation status